The Isabella Island, part of the Big Green Group within the Furneaux Group,  is a  unpopulated granite island, located in the Bass Strait, west of the Flinders Island and south of Chalky Island, in Tasmania, in south-eastern Australia. The island is a nature reserve and is part of the Chalky, Big Green and Badger Island Groups Important Bird Area.

Fauna
Recorded breeding seabird and wader species are little penguin, Pacific gull, sooty oystercatcher and pied oystercatcher.  Cape Barren geese also breed there.  Reptiles present include the metallic skink, White's skink and white-lipped snake.

See also

 List of islands of Tasmania

References

Furneaux Group
Important Bird Areas of Tasmania
Islands of Bass Strait
Islands of North East Tasmania